Dhoki Dam ,  is an earth-fill dam on Kalu river in Dhoki village in Parner taluka of Ahmednagar district of state of Maharashtra in India.

Specifications

Purpose
 Irrigation
 Drinking water for nearest villages

See also
 Dams in Maharashtra

References

Dams in Ahmednagar district
Earth-filled dams
Dams completed in 1981
1981 establishments in Maharashtra